Friends of Parks South Australia, registered as Friends of Parks Inc., (FoPInc), is an independent umbrella organisation established to serve and represent the interests of volunteer community groups helping to protect flora, fauna, heritage and other significant sites within South Australia's protected area system.  FoPInc collaborates with the South Australian Department for Environment and Water (DEW) and National Parks and Wildlife Service South Australia (NPWS),  FoPInc has 146 member groups.

History
"Friends" groups are typically affiliated with a specific conservation park, historic site or other protected area. The first such group started at Fort Glanville Conservation Park in 1980, where there had been an existing historical society. The second group was formed at Ferguson Conservation Park in Stonyfell. In 1983, the National Parks and Wildlife Service set up the Friends of Old Government House in Belair National Park. The success of the Friends model had been demonstrated and in the following years many more groups were set up.

FoPInc was established as a charitable organisation on 1 November 1999, and has an associated gift fund with Deductible Gift Recipient status.

Description and structure
FoPInc is governed by a board, and is supported by a secretariat provided through DEW's Volunteer Support Programs Unit, based in Adelaide, which coordinates the network of member groups.

Member groups may be either "full" (working on-park, and may or may not be incorporated in their own right), or 
"affiliate" (involved with other DEW-endorsed projects, and incorporated in their own right). Each group is supported by a NPWS Liaison Ranger in order to ensure co-ordination with the goals and policies of DEW and park management plans.

The objectives of "Friends" groups are: to provide opportunities for public participation in the management of national parks and historic sites; to raise funds to support national parks, historic sites and the social functions of the Friends group; to publicise national parks and historic sites as well as the objectives of the Friends; and to provide cultural and social events for the benefit of members, staff and the general public.

Each Friends group is financially self-supporting, through a combination of members fees and fund-raising. In addition, the Department of Environment and Water (DEW) provides "Small Grants" for which individual groups may apply on a project basis.

Collectively FoPInc represents over 5,000 individual volunteers in South Australia, who are each affiliated with one or more specific member groups associated with a national park or historic site. In 2015–16, members of Friends groups contributed the equivalent of 11,161 days of volunteer work to the state's protected areas.

 the president of Friends of Parks is Duncan MacKenzie .

List of places with Friends groups

Parks

Buildings
 Adelaide Gaol
 Fort Glanville
 Martindale Hall
 Mt Lofty Fire Tower
 Old Government House

Other
 Adelaide Dolphin Sanctuary
 Gamble Garden
 Gulf St Vincent
 Heysen Walking Trails and other Walking Trails
 Society for Underwater Historical Research (2002 to 2012)
 Sporting Shooters Association of Australia's Conservation and wildlife management branch
 State Herbarium of South Australia

See also
 Protected areas of South Australia

Footnotes

References

External links

 
Nature conservation organisations based in Australia
1993 establishments in Australia